This is a list of foreign ministers of the Marshall Islands.

1979–1987: Tony deBrum
1987–1988: Charles Domnick
1988–1994: Tom Kijiner
1994–2000: Phillip H. Muller
2000–2001: Alvin Jacklick
2001–2008: Gerald Zackios
2008–2009: Tony deBrum
2009–2012: John Silk
2012–2014: Phillip H. Muller
2014–2016: Tony deBrum
2016............ Kessai Note
2016–2020: John Silk
2020–present: Casten Nemra

Sources
Rulers.org – Foreign ministers L–R

Foreign
Foreign Ministers
 
1979 establishments in the Marshall Islands